Ouersnia, also spelled Ouarsania, pronounced Warsnia ( or ,) is a village located in Ben Guerdane City, in Southeastern Tunisia.
It lies about 5 km in the center of the city of Ben Guerdane and has an area of 137 square kilometers. Its population reached 8,421 people according to 2014 statistics.

References

Populated places in Tunisia
Medenine Governorate
Ben Gardane